Geum montanum, the Alpine avens, is a species of flowering plant of the genus Geum in the Rosaceae family, native to the mountains of central and southern Europe.

Distribution 
Geum montanum is widespread in the Alps, typically at elevations in the range 1430–2300m (though it occurs at as low as 700m in Centovalli and as high as 3500m in Monte Rosa). It is found in the Pyrenees, the Cantabrians, the Massif Central, the Black Forest, the Sudetes (1300–1400m), throughout the Carpathians (900–2500m in the Tatras), in the north of the Apennines, on the island of Corsica, and on the Balkan Peninsula: in the mountains of Bosnia and Herzegovina, Montenegro, North Macedonia, Albania, Kosovo (specifically in Žljeb and Prokletije), northernmost Greece (2000–2500m in Varnous, Kajmakčalan and Tzena), in the east of Serbia (Suva Planina) and the west of Bulgaria (at elevations of 1600–2700m in western and central Stara Planina, Sredna Gora, Vitosha, Osogovo, Rila, Pirin, Slavyanka and the western Rhodopes).

Uses 
In cultivation in the UK, Geum montanum has gained the Royal Horticultural Society's Award of Garden Merit.

Geum montanum roots have been used in the traditional Austrian medicine internally as tea for treatment of rheumatism, gout, infections, and fever.

Notes

External links

montanum
Flora of Romania
Flora of Europe
Plants described in 1753
Taxa named by Carl Linnaeus
Flora of the Alps
Flora of the Carpathians
Flora of the Pyrenees